Kentucky Route 1932 (KY 1932) is a  state highway in the U.S. State of Kentucky. Its southern terminus is at U.S. Route 31E (US 31E) in Louisville and its northern terminus is at US 42 in Louisville.

Major junctions

Gallery

References

1932
1932
Transportation in Louisville, Kentucky